The 2016–17 Portland State Vikings women's basketball team represents Portland State University during the 2016–17 NCAA Division I women's basketball season. The Vikings, led by second-year head coach Lynn Kennedy, play their home games at the Peter Stott Center and were members of the Big Sky Conference. They finished the season 16–17, 8–10 in Big Sky play to finish in seventh place. They advance to the semifinals of the Big Sky women's tournament to Idaho State.

Roster

Schedule

|-
!colspan=9 style="background:#02461D; color:#FFFFFF;"| Exhibition

|-
!colspan=9 style="background:#02461D; color:#FFFFFF;"| Non-conference regular season

|-
!colspan=9 style="background:#02461D; color:#FFFFFF;"| Big Sky regular season

|-
!colspan=9 style="background:#02461D;"| Big Sky Women's Tournament

See also
2016–17 Portland State Vikings men's basketball team

References

Portland State
Portland State Vikings women's basketball seasons
Portland State Vikings women's basketball
Portland State Vikings women's basketball